Yunus Emre Yalçın (born 12 September 1994) is a Turkish footballer. He made his Süper Lig debut on 16 May 2014.

References

External links
 
 
 

1994 births
People from Konak
Footballers from İzmir
Living people
Turkish footballers
Association football midfielders
Konyaspor footballers
1922 Konyaspor footballers
İstanbulspor footballers
Sakaryaspor footballers
Gümüşhanespor footballers
Kırklarelispor footballers
Süper Lig players
TFF First League players
TFF Second League players
TFF Third League players